Moterys meluoja geriau (Women Lie Better) is a Lithuanian TV series produced by TV3. It is the most watched Lithuanian drama of all time. The first season is based on the 2002 novel by Daiva Vaitkevičiūtė and follows four young women and their love interests. In later seasons the series don't concentrate on them as much. The first season, which was released in 2008, stars Jurgita Jurkutė, Vytautas Šapranauskas, Giedrius Savickas, Edita Užaitė, Sigitas Račkys, Inga Norkutė, Darius Meškauskas, Arūnas Storpirštis, Jūratė Budriūnaitė, Ramūnas Rudokas, and Marius Jampolskis.

The series premiered on TV3 on February 4, 2008, in Lithuania.

Episodes

Cast and characters

 Inga Norkutė as Meda
 Nerijus Gadliauskas as Robertas “Robertėlis” (seasons 4–7, 9–14; recurring seasons 1–3)
 Kristina Andrejauskaitė as Irena (seasons 5–7, 9–14; recurring seasons 2–4)
 Evaldas Jaras as Adamas (season 8, 12–14; recurring season 7 and 10)
 Vitalija Mockevičiūtė as Galina (seasons 5–10, 12–14)
 Ramūnas Rudokas as Marijus (seasons 1–7; 9–10; 12–14)
 Agnė Šataitė as Ugnė (seasons 3–7; 12 and 14; recurring seasons 2 and 13)
 Marius Jampolskis as Donatas (seasons 1–7; 9–11; 13–14)
 Goda Petkutė as Laura (seasons 11–14)
 Ridas Žirgulis as Kostas (seasons 13–14, recurring season 12)
 Ugnė Žirgulė as Regina (seasons 13–14, recurring season 12)
 Ineta Stasiulytė as Natalija (season 14, recurring season 13)

Cast overview

Awards and nominations

References

Lithuanian television series
2000s Lithuanian television series
2010s Lithuanian television series
2008 Lithuanian television series debuts
TV3 (Lithuania) original programming